Lusorex is an extinct genus of heterosoricid shrew that lived in China during the Miocene. The only species is L. taishanensis, fossils of which are kept at the Paleozoological Museum of China.

External links
Lusorex at fossilworks

Miocene mammals of Asia
Shrews
Fossils of China
Fossil taxa described in 2004